BBC Learning English, a department of the BBC World Service devoted to English language teaching
 Learning English, Lesson One, an album by the German punk band Die Toten Hosen
 Learning English, a controlled version (about 1500 words) of English used by Voice of America